The Master Mind is a 1914 American silent crime/drama film released by Paramount Pictures, directed by Oscar Apfel and Cecil B. DeMille and stars Edmund Breese. The film is based on the play of the same name by Daniel D. Carter.

Overview
The plot revolves around a defense attorney who, unable to obtain the acquittal of an innocent young man, concocts a complicated and diabolical scheme to revenge himself upon the prosecutor.

Cast
Edmund Breese as Richard Allen
Fred Montague as Henry Allen
Jane Darwell as Milwaukee Sadie
Dick La Reno as Blount
Harry Fisher as Diamond Willie
Mabel Van Buren as Lucine, Three-Arm Fanny
Richard La Strang as Safe Blower 
Monroe Salisbury as District attorney
Billy Elmer as Creegan

See also
 List of American films of 1914

References

External links

1914 films
American crime drama films
American silent feature films
American black-and-white films
American films based on plays
Films directed by Cecil B. DeMille
Films directed by Oscar Apfel
1910s crime drama films
Paramount Pictures films
1914 drama films
1910s American films
Silent American drama films
1910s English-language films